Lalinok is a village (local part) in the administrative district of Divinka in northern Slovakia.

History 
The first written mention of Lalinok dates back to April 4, 1325, in the document dealing with the property transfers of the noble Borčický family, Lalinok is referred to as Lylihng. The earliest direct written record of Divinka is preserved in the letter of the Nitra Cathedral chapter (Latin: Capitulum Ecclesiae Nitriensis), dated to March 19, 1393. The Chapter announced not only King Sigismund of Luxembourg but all the villages of the Lietava estate, including Divinka (referred to as Kysdywyne) and Lalinok (referred to as Lelenk), too, that the new lawful overlord of Lietava castle and the estate had become Dezider from Kapla. From September 22, 1911 is Lalinok a part of Divinka village.

Historical names 

 1325 Lylihng
 1387 Lelinek
 1393 Lelenk
 1395 Leleuch
 1416 Lelenk
 1438 Lalinka, Lelinka
 1598 and 1853 Lalinek
 1742 and 1800 Lalin
 1927 Lalinek

Monuments 

 Walled cross from 1907 with the Art Nouveau elements.
 Small chapel dedicated to the Virgin Mary, coming from the late 19th century.
 Bell tower with the bell from 1819.
 Memorial dedicated to WWI victims from Lalinok village. The memorial is located at the local cemetery.
 Old wooden folk houses from the 19th and 20th century.

Natives 

 Ondrej Sobola (*August 7, 1880 Lalinok – † c. 1915 Russian battlefield; December 31, 1918 officially) was a farmer, worker and an Austro-Hungarian Army soldier. On his honour and memory an international project Tree of Peace was created. His name and portrait is on a common Memorial dedicated to WWI victims from Lalinok village in the local cemetery. His portrait is also on a Memorial pillar in the Emperor's park of Kaiservilla in Bad Ischl.

References

External links 

 Surnames of living people in Divinka
Pictures from Lalinok in Zilina-Gallery

Villages and municipalities in Žilina District